Valgeir Sigurðsson (born 18 June 1971) is an Icelandic record producer, mixer, composer, audio engineer and musician.

Biography
Coming from a musical background, Valgeir's fascination with recording technology led to a job in a small recording studio at the age of 16. He plays keyboards, bass, percussion, electronics/programming and studied classical guitar, graduating with a Tonmeister degree from London's SAE Institute. In 1998 Valgeir was hired by fellow countrywoman Björk as engineer and programmer on the soundtrack for Lars von Trier's Dancer in the Dark. A song from the film, I've Seen It All (a duet with Radiohead's Thom Yorke) was nominated for the Academy Award for Best Original Song but lost to Bob Dylan's Things Have Changed. Valgeir created the distinctive train-rhythm that runs through the song. His working relationship with Björk continued beyond the film project and was consistent from early 1998 until 2006, during which time Valgeir was one of her main studio collaborators.

Valgeir is the founder of Greenhouse Studios, Iceland's top recording facility established in 1997, where in addition to Björk, he has collaborated with artists such as Bonnie 'Prince' Billy, Feist, Damon Albarn, Camille, CocoRosie, Ben Frost, Sam Amidon, múm, Hilary Hahn & Hauschka, Brian Eno, Sigur Rós, Emel Mathlouthi, and many others. In 2005 he founded the Bedroom Community record label launching the recording career of Nico Muhly and producing and releasing albums by Ben Frost and Sam Amidon. 
He has composed music for TV, film and theatre and his debut solo album Ekvílibríum was released by Bedroom Community in 2007, followed by a release of his soundtrack for Dreamland (Draumalandið) in 2009. The score of Dreamland was performed live in 2011 by the Iceland Symphony Orchestra by the Winnipeg Symphony Orchestra in 2012, and the BBC Scottish Symphony Orchestra and Ilan Volkov, in 2013.  His first conventional classical commission, Nebraska Quartet was premiered by the Chiara String Quartet at the Lincoln Center during NYC's Ecstatic Music Festival in 2011. Valgeir's third LP Architecture of Loss was released in September 2012 to critical acclaim. Ghosts, for chamber ensemble, was the result of a commission the Crash Ensemble, and launched in Dublin in November 2013.  The Winnipeg Symphony Orchestra and Alexander Mickelthwate premiered Eighteen Hundred and Seventy-Five, for orchestra and electronics, as part of its annual New Music Festival in January 2014.

Selected works

Stage works
Green Aria (co-composed with Nico Muhly), for chamber orchestra and electronics, 2009
Architecture of Loss, ballet for chamber ensemble of 3 players and electronics, 2012
Wide Slumber for lepidopterists music-theatre piece for 3 singers, 4 musicians and electronics, 2014
Woman Undone, music-theatre work for five singers/instrumentalists, 2018

Orchestral
Dreamland for large orchestra and electronics, 2011
Dreamland for chamber orchestra and optional electronics, 2013
Eighteen Hundred and Seventy-Five for orchestra and electronics, 2013
No Nights Dark Enough for chamber orchestra and electronics, 2014

Ensemble
Past Tundra for chamber ensemble of 9 players with electronics, 2011
Nebraska for string quartet, 2011
Architecture of Loss, ballet for chamber ensemble of 3 players and electronics, 2012
Ghosts, for chamber ensemble of 10 players with electronics, 2013
The Crumbling (from Architecture of Loss), for chamber ensemble of 6 players, 2014
Raindamage, for string trio and electronics, 2014
Dissonance, for viola da gamba and electronics, 2014
Veej, for chamber ensemble of 18 players, 2015
For Love of Her (do but kill me), for voice, chamber ensemble of 10 players and electronics, 2015
Remnant, for viola and electronics, 2018
Dust, for violin and electronics, 2018

Electronics Only
Antigravity, electronic track, 2016

Discography

Solo

Production

Film and TV

Other 
Green Aria Music composed by Valgeir Sigurðsson and Nico Muhly for Scent Opera. Guggenheim Museum, NYC, 2009.

References

External links

Artist page on Bedroom Community

Myspace
Valgeir Sigurdsson: Björk's right-hand man takes centre stage The Independent, 21 September 2007

1971 births
Living people
Valgeir Sigurdsson
Valgeir Sigurdsson